José Roberto Reynoso Fernandez (born 7 July 1947) is a Brazilian equestrian. He competed in two events at the 1968 Summer Olympics.

References

1947 births
Living people
Brazilian male equestrians
Olympic equestrians of Brazil
Equestrians at the 1968 Summer Olympics
Pan American Games medalists in equestrian
Pan American Games gold medalists for Brazil
Equestrians at the 1967 Pan American Games
Sportspeople from São Paulo
Medalists at the 1967 Pan American Games
21st-century Brazilian people
20th-century Brazilian people